Charles Reid Acland (born October 4, 1963) is a professor and was the Department Chairperson in the Communications Studies Department at Concordia University, Montreal, Quebec, Canada from 2018 until June 1, 2020.  His research interests include: popular culture, media studies, cultural history and cultural theory.  He is the Editor of the Canadian Journal of Film Studies and co-editor of Useful Cinema (Duke University Press, 2011), Residual Media (University of Minnesota Press, 2007), and Harold Innis in the New Century (McGill-Queen's University Press, 1999). He is also the author of three books: Swift Viewing: The Popular Life of Subliminal Influence (Duke University Press, 2012), Screen Traffic: Movies, Multiplexes, and Global Culture (Duke University Press, 2003) and Youth, Murder, Spectacle: The Cultural Politics of "Youth in Crisis," (Westview Press, 1995).

Writings

Acland has spoken and written about the nonexistence of Subliminal Perception.  He was interviewed on this topic on the Colin McEnroe radio show in 2012, and his publication Swift Viewing: The Popular Life of Subliminal Influence asserts that there is no such thing as subliminal perception, at least not in the sense of spectators in a movie theatre being hypnotized to buy popcorn and drinks by having messages flashed at them at speeds beneath the threshold of human perception.

Acland's monograph Screen Traffic:  Movies, Multiplexes and Global Culture discusses the business practices and promotional tactics of the film industry in a global context, and explains the history of the multiplex.  The publication received positive reviews, and is used as a reference text in media courses.

Acland and co-editor Haidee Wasson have pursued extensive research into "useful cinema", that is, the use of film in institutions such as libraries, museums, and classrooms, as well as the workplace.  Acland's Screen essay "Curtains, Carts and the Mobile Screen," which won the Kovacs Prize for Best Essay, from the Society for Cinema and Media Studies in 2010 pursues this concept, as does his reflections on the tachistoscope in Swift Viewing.

Acland coined the phrase "residual media" to describe the phenomena of old media interacting with newer and currently dominant forms.  He is a regular contributor on this topic to the online journal of television and media studies Flow.

Acland's book Youth, Murder, Spectacle presents the results of a study of the cultural roots violence among contemporary youth. At the centre of Acland's analysis is the sensationalization and exploitation of the murder of eighteen-year-old Jennifer Levin at the hands of nineteen-year-old Robert Chambers on August 6, 1986 in New York's Central Park.

Acland has also written an extensive collection of essays, Harold Innis in the New Century which  synthesize and assess the work and influence of Harold Innis, an economist, historian and essayist, who developed the foundations of the field of Communication Studies.

Selected publications

 2012.  Acland, Charles R. Swift Viewing: The Popular Life of Subliminal Influence, Duke University Press, pp. 328.
 2011.  Acland, Charles R. and Haidee Wasson (editors). Useful Cinema, edited with Haidee Wasson, Duke University Press, pp. 386.
 2007.  Acland, Charles R. (editor). Residual Media, University of Minnesota Press, pp. 416.
 2003.  Acland, Charles R. Screen Traffic: Movies, Multiplexes, and Global Culture. Duke U. Press, pp 337.
 1999.  Acland, Charles R. and William Buxton (editors). Harold Innis in the New Century: Reflections and Refractions, Montreal: McGill-Queen's U. Press, pp. 435.
 1995.  Acland, Charles R. Youth, Murder, Spectacle: The Cultural Politics of "Youth in Crisis," Boulder, CO.: Westview Press

.

Awards 

2019, Distinguished University Research Professor, Concordia University
2011, Useful Cinema, edited with Haidee Wasson, Duke University Press, pp. 386. Awarded honorable mention as the 2013 SCMS Best Edited Book and finalist for the 2012 Kraszna-Krausz Best Moving Image Book Award.
2009, "Curtains, Carts and the Mobile Screen," Screen, 50.1, 148–166. Winner of the 2010 Kovacs Prize for Best Essay, from the Society for Cinema and Media Studies.
2003, Screen Traffic: Movies, Multiplexes, and Global Culture. Duke U. Press, pp 337. Winner of the 2004 Robinson Book Prize for Best Book by a Canadian Communication Scholar.

References 

 
 2007. Braunstein, L. R. "Residual Media." Choice 45.2 (2007): 276–77.
 2012.  Colin McEnroe Show: Is Subliminal Influence Real?  WNPR Public Radio, April 2.
 1997. Cook, Elizabeth. "Youth, Murder, Spectacle: The Cultural Politics of "Youth in Crisis"." Annals of the American Academy of Political and Social Science 553: 224-25. Print.
 2012. Deutsch, J. I. "Useful Cinema." Choice 49.10: 1881.
 1995. Hildahl, S. H. "Sociology -- Youth, Murder, Spectacle: The Cultural Politics of 'Youth in Crisis' by Charles R. Acland." Choice 33.1: 221.
 2005. Jones, Janna. "Book Review of "Screen Traffic: Movies, Multiplexes, and Global Culture," by Charles R. Acland." Popular Communication 3.2: 149.
 1995. McCabe, Mary Margaret. "Preppy Panics -- Youth, Murder, Spectacle: The Cultural Politics of "Youth in Crisis" by Charles R. Acland." TLS, the Times Literary Supplement.4800: 11.
 2008. Mullen, Megan. "Residual Media." Technology and Culture 49.2: 506–08.
 2008. Price, Leah. "Residual Media." Modernism/Modernity 15.2: 418–19.
 2005. Seago, Alex. "Screen Traffic Movies, Multiplexes, and Global Culture." American Studies 46.2: 207–08. Print

External links
Departement of Communications Studies: Charles R Acland
 Canadian Journal of Film Studies (Editor)

Living people
1963 births
Academic staff of Concordia University
Carleton University alumni